Robert Mitchell (14 December 1913 – 12 November 1996) was a British water polo player who competed in the 1936 Summer Olympics. He was part of the British team which finished eighth in the 1936 tournament. He played all seven matches.

Twelve years later at the 1948 Summer Olympics he was a reserve player and did not participate in a match during the 1948 tournament. He was later a member of the Greater London Council (1964–86). He stood as the Conservative candidate in two General Elections, 1964 and 1966, in West Ham South, but lost both times.

References

External links
 

1913 births
1996 deaths
British male water polo players
Olympic water polo players of Great Britain
Water polo players at the 1936 Summer Olympics
Water polo players at the 1948 Summer Olympics
Members of the Greater London Council